The 1976 Middle Tennessee Blue Raiders football team represented Middle Tennessee State University—as a member of the Ohio Valley Conference (OVC) during the 1976 NCAA Division II football season. Led by second-year head coach Ben Hurt, the Blue Raiders compiled a record an overall record of 4–7 with a mark of 2–5 in conference play. The team's captains were Dunster, Wright, and Wright.

Schedule

References

Middle Tennessee
Middle Tennessee Blue Raiders football seasons
Middle Tennessee Blue Raiders football